Golian (also Romanized as Golīān, Gelīān, Geleyān, Gīlen, and Golīyān) is a village in Golian Rural District, in the Central District of Shirvan County, North Khorasan Province, Iran. At the 2006 census, its population was 619, in 178 families.

References 

Populated places in Shirvan County